Wilfrid Prévost (April 30, 1832 – February 15, 1898) was a lawyer and political figure in Quebec, Canada. He represented Two Mountains in the House of Commons of Canada as a Liberal member from 1872 to 1875.

He was born in Sainte-Anne-des-Plaines, Lower Canada in 1832 and studied at the Collège Saint-Sulpice at Montreal, the Collège de l'Assomption and the Séminaire de Saint-Hyacinthe. Prévost articled in law and was admitted to the bar in 1853. He practiced at Terrebonne, Sainte-Scholastique, Montreal and Saint-Jérôme. He was named Queen's Counsel in 1878. Prevost served several terms as mayor for Sainte-Scholastique and was also warden for Deux-Montagnes County. He was named to the Legislative Council of Quebec for Rigaud division in 1888. He died at Saint-Jérôme in 1898 and was buried at Terrebonne.

His son Jean was a member of the Quebec legislative assembly and served in the provincial cabinet. His older brother Gédéon-Mélasippe served in the legislative assembly of the Province of Canada.

By-election: On election being declared void, 14 January 1875

External links 
 
 

1832 births
1898 deaths
Liberal Party of Canada MPs
Members of the House of Commons of Canada from Quebec
Quebec Liberal Party MLCs
Mayors of places in Quebec
People from Laurentides
Canadian King's Counsel